Tymon Mabaleka (1950 – 27 June 2014) was a Zimbabwean footballer and music producer. He was nicknamed "The Whitehorse". His career lasted for nearly twenty years in sports and another fifteen years in the music industry.

Mabaleka was born in Nswazi in Umzingwane District. He attended Longfield Primary School in Nswazi for his early education. He then relocated to Bulawayo and studied at Msitheli High School for his secondary education. 

Football

He played for the famous Bulawayo football team Highlanders Football Club. Tymon Mabaleka began his illustrious career at Eastlands before moving to Highlanders in 1973. That season is considered as the turning point for the once docile giant in semi-professional football. Bosso who had been promoted back to the elite league after topping the lower division in 1972 following their demotion in 1971 when they finished with a paltry seven points, relied on the brilliance of players like Tymon Mabaleka to assert themselves as one of Zimbabwe’s top sides.  

With Tymon Whitehorse Mabaleka in the thick of things alongside Cavin Duberly, Lawrence Phiri, Billy Sibanda, Edward Dzowa, Kenny Luphahla, Mike Mpofu, Peter Bhebhe, Ananias Dube, Josiah Nxumalo and Boet Van Ays, Highlanders won their first major title – the 1973 Chibuku Trophy and regional title.

Music

He worked for Gallo Records, and was one of the country’s most revered music producers, and often referred to as Zimbabwe's "Quincy Jones" (the prolific & well renowned American music producer). 

The list of musicians he worked with and produced is endless. He is responsible for the success of Zimbabwe's household musicians like Oliver Mtukudzi, James Chimombe, Lovemore Majaivana, Ilanga, Solomon S’kuza and the Fallen Heroes, Ebony Sheikh, The Frontline Kids, Shepherd Chinyani and the Vhuka Boys, Leonard Zhakata, the late John Chibadura, The Essentials, Kassongo Band and the Zimbabwe People’s Band, as well as many others.

He is responsible for having produced one of Matabeleland’s most recognised and adorable musicians, the legendary Lovemore Majaivana, with top hits such as Stimela, Salanini Zinini, Sono Sami Kuleliyani’zwe, Dabuka Mhlaba, Inyoni Bani, Engelamathambo, Mkhwenyana, Bambulele uMajola, to name a few. 

Tymon Mabaleka also produced the late Solomon S’kuza’s Love and Scandals album and many more of Solomon Skuza’s hits. In his passion for high-quality productions, he also came up with gems such as Ebony Sheikh’s ‘Emhlabeni Kunzima’, Shepherd Chinyani and the Vhuka Boys’ ‘Mai Vakakosha’, ‘Mugove’ by Leonard Zhakata and the late John Chibadura’s collections.

Mabaleka died in Harare, Zimbabwe from unknown causes, aged 64 or 65. He is survived by his wife, Josephine Mabaleka, and three children. He was buried in Bulawayo on July 3, 2014..

References

External links
 Zimbabwe: Rip, Tymon Mabaleka

1949 births
1950 births
2014 deaths
Zimbabwean footballers
Zimbabwean record producers
Highlanders F.C. players
Alumni of Mzilikazi High School
Association footballers not categorized by position